The 1991 Supercoppa Italiana was a match contested by 1990–91 Serie A winners Sampdoria and 1990–91 Coppa Italia winners Roma.

The match took place on 24 August 1991 in Marassi, Genoa and resulted in a 1–0 victory for Sampdoria.

Match details

Supercoppa Italiana
Supercoppa 1991
Supercoppa 1991
Supercoppa Italiana
Football in Genoa